The Anarchist insurrection of Alt Llobregat, Spain was a revolutionary general strike which took place in January 1932, principally organized by Confederación Nacional del Trabajo (CNT) unions in the mining and textile sectors. It was the first of the three insurrections carried out by the CNT during the time of the Second Spanish Republic, followed by the anarchist insurrections of January and December 1933.

History
The outbreak of the revolutionary strike was due to the economic situation in the area and the country, and the expectations of radical social change since the early days of the republican era in many sectors of workers. In Catalonia, the most radical sectors of the anarchists controlled the CNT, which coincided with an increase in social conflict between workers and the republican state. Some workers even proclaimed "libertarian communism." The revolt was a response to the harsh working conditions in the mines, with long hours and lack of security at the bottom of the shafts, and also the expectations raised by the new rights of assembly and association that the newly approved Spanish Constitution of 1931 recognized. 

The following day the conflict had spread to other towns in Alt Llobregat including Berga, Sallent, Cardona, Balsareny, Navarclés and Súria, where the strikers stopped the mines and closed the shops. In Manresa workers' pickets prevented access to factories and workshops. Telephone lines were cut. In many places republican flags were replaced by the red and black flags of the CNT. That same day a delegate from the CNT Regional Committee proclaimed in Fígols, in front of the revolutionary committee created by the miners, that "libertarian communism had arrived", news that spread throughout the area.

The following day, 21 January, Manuel Azaña declared before the Cortes: "I am not scared that there are strikes ... because it is a right recognized by law", but no one could take "an attitude of rebellion against the Republic" and that the military had the obligation to intervene against these "excesses". The government of the Republic ordered an armed intervention and thus, on 22 January, the first military units arrived in Manresa, and by the next day had occupied all the towns in the area except Fígols. The miners had blown up a powder magazine and fled through the mountains. Republican rule was restored and the miners were fired. 

On 23 January, when only Fígols remained under insurgent control, the National Committee of the CNT agreed to "give the order to stop all of Spain, accepting all consequences." However, only a few isolated towns in Valencia and Aragon followed in the footsteps of Alt Llobregat. In Alcorisa the insurgents planted two bombs in the Civil Guard barracks, and in Castel de Cabra the rioters seized "the City Hall, destroyed the tax register and all the documents that were in the archives of the municipal secretary." Infantry troops were sent from Barcelona under the command of Domingo Batet to put an end to the riots. On 24 January Fígols was recaptured by the state, and by 27 January the first anarchist insurrection against the Republic came to an end.

They were transferred to the steamship "Buenos Aires", anchored in the port, for deporttation. Four days later there were already more than 200 detainees on the ship. On 28 January a hundred of the deportees started a hunger strike in protest, and wrote a manifesto denouncing their defenselessness. Some managed to leave, but on 10 February the "Buenos Aires" set sail from the port of Barcelona with 104 detainees on board. After picking up other detainees in Cádiz, the ship passed through the Canary Islands and finally docked at Villa Cisneros on April 3. On the way some of the prisoners, one of whom died, had fallen ill, and others were released. The last deportees returned to the peninsula in September.

With this mass deportation, the confrontations between the CNT and the republican-socialist government became even more intense. The uprising was also a trigger for a further split within the CNT between the libertarian possibilist tendency and the anarchist, as the strategic differences of each sector began to clash. After publishing a manifesto, Ángel Pestaña and other possibilists were expelled from the CNT and formed the Syndicalist Party, with the intention of participating in state politics.

See also
 Revolutionary Catalunya

References

General strikes in Spain
Anarchism in Spain
History of Catalonia
History of Spain
1932 labor disputes and strikes
1932 in Spain